An acronym is a word or name consisting of parts of the full name's words. Acronyms are usually formed from the initial letters of words, as in NATO (North Atlantic Treaty Organization), but sometimes use syllables, as in Benelux (short for Belgium, the Netherlands, and Luxembourg), NAPOCOR (National Power Corporation), and TRANSCO (National Transmission Corporation). They can also be a mixture, as in radar (Radio Detection And Ranging) and MIDAS (Missile Defense Alarm System).

Acronyms can be pronounced as words, like NASA and UNESCO; as individual letters, like CIA, TNT, NPC, BLM, and ATM; or as both letters and words, like JPEG, CSIS (SEE-sis), and IUPAC (I-U-pak). Some are not universally pronounced one way or the other and it depends on the speaker's preference or the context in which it is being used, such as SQL (either "sequel" or "ess-cue-el").

The broader sense of acronym—the meaning of which includes terms pronounced as individual letters— is sometimes criticized, but that is the term's original meaning, and is still in common use. Dictionary and style-guide editors are not in universal agreement on the naming for such abbreviations, and it is a matter of some dispute whether the term acronym can be legitimately applied to abbreviations which are not pronounced "as words", nor do these language authorities agree on the correct use of spacing, casing, and punctuation.

Abbreviations formed from a string of initials and usually pronounced as individual letters are sometimes more specifically called initialisms or alphabetisms; examples are FBI from Federal Bureau of Investigation, ABS-CBN from Alto Broadcasting System - Chronicle Broadcasting Network, GMA from Global Media Arts, NPC from National Power Corporation, NGCP from National Grid Corporation of the Philippines, and e.g. from Latin .

Etymology 
The word acronym is formed from the Greek roots acr-, meaning "height, summit, or tip" and -onym, meaning "name". This neoclassical compound appears to have originated in German, with attestations for the German form  appearing as early as 1921. Citations in English date to a 1940 translation of a novel by the German writer Lion Feuchtwanger.

Nomenclature 
Whereas an abbreviation may be any type of shortened form, such as words with the middle omitted (for example, Rd. for Road or Dr. for Doctor) or the end truncated (as in Prof. for Professor), an acronym is—in the broad sense—formed from the first letter or first few letters of each important word in a phrase (such as AIDS, from acquired immuno-deficiency syndrome, and scuba from self-contained underwater breathing apparatus). However, this is only a loose rule of thumb, as some acronyms are built in part from the first letters of morphemes (word components; as in the i and d in immuno-deficiency) or using a letter from the middle or end of a word, or from only a few key words in a long phrase or name. Less significant words such as in, of, and the are usually dropped (NYT for The New York Times, DMV for Department of Motor Vehicles), but not always (TICA for The International Cat Association, DOJ for Department of Justice).

Abbreviations formed from a string of initials and usually pronounced as individual letters (as in FBI from Federal Bureau of Investigation, and e.g. from Latin ) are sometimes more specifically called initialisms or alphabetisms. Occasionally, some letter other than the first is chosen, most often when the pronunciation of the name of the letter coincides with the pronunciation of the beginning of the word (example: BX from base exchange). Acronyms that are usually pronounced as words, such as AIDS and scuba, are sometimes called word acronyms, to disambiguate them more clearly from initialisms, especially since some users of the term "initialism" use "acronym" in a narrow sense meaning only the type sounded out as letters. Another sub-type of acronym (or a related form, depending upon one's definitions) is the syllabic abbreviation, which is composed specifically of multi-letter syllabic (even multi-syllabic) fragments of the abbreviated words; some examples are FOREX from foreign exchange, and Interpol from international + police, though its full proper name in English is the International Criminal Police Organization. Usually the first syllable (or two) is used from each major component word, but there are exceptions, such as the U.S. Navy term DESRON or DesRon from destroyer squadron.

There is no special term for abbreviations whose pronunciation involves the combination of letter names with words, or with word-like pronunciations of strings of letters, such as JPEG and MS-DOS. Similarly, there is no unique name for those that are a mixture of syllabic abbreviations and initialisms; these are usually pronounced as words (e.g., radar from radio detection and ranging, consisting of one syllabic abbreviation and three single letters, and sonar from sound navigation ranging, consisting of two syllabic abbreviations followed by a single acronymic letter for ranging); these would generally qualify as word acronyms among those who use that term. There is also some disagreement as to what to call an abbreviation that some speakers pronounce as letters but others pronounce as a word. The same character string may be pronounced differently when the meaning is different; IRA is always sounded out as I-R-A when standing for Irish Republican Army.

The spelled-out form of an acronym, initialism, or syllabic abbreviation (that is, what that abbreviation stands for) is called its expansion.

Lexicography and style guides 
It is an unsettled question in English lexicography and style guides whether it is legitimate to use the word acronym to describe forms that use initials but are not pronounced as a word. While there is plenty of evidence that acronym is used widely in this way, some sources do not acknowledge this usage, reserving the term acronym only for forms pronounced as a word, and using initialism or abbreviation for those that are not. Some sources acknowledge the usage, but vary in whether they criticize or forbid it, allow it without comment, or explicitly advocate for it.

Some mainstream English dictionaries from across the English-speaking world affirm a sense of acronym which does not require being pronounced as a word. American English dictionaries such as Merriam-Webster, Dictionary.com's Random House Webster's Unabridged Dictionary and the American Heritage Dictionary as well as the British Oxford English Dictionary and the Australian Macquarie Dictionary all include a sense in their entries for acronym equating it with initialism, although The American Heritage Dictionary criticizes it with the label "usage problem". However, many English language dictionaries, such as the Collins COBUILD Advanced Dictionary, Cambridge Advanced Learner's Dictionary, Macmillan Dictionary, Longman Dictionary of Contemporary English, New Oxford American Dictionary, Webster's New World Dictionary, and Lexico from Oxford University Press do not acknowledge such a sense.

Most of the dictionary entries and style guide recommendations regarding the term acronym through the twentieth century did not explicitly acknowledge or support the expansive sense. The Merriam–Webster's Dictionary of English Usage from 1994 is one of the earliest publications to advocate for the expansive sense, and all the major dictionary editions that include a sense of acronym equating it with initialism were first published in the twenty-first century. The trend among dictionary editors appears to be towards including a sense defining acronym as initialism: The Merriam-Webster Collegiate Dictionary added such a sense in its eleventh edition in 2003, and both the Oxford English Dictionary and the American Heritage Dictionary added such senses in their 2011 editions. The 1989 edition of the Oxford English Dictionary only included the exclusive sense for acronym and its earliest citation was from 1943. In early December 2010, Duke University researcher Stephen Goranson published a citation for acronym to the American Dialect Society e-mail discussion list which refers to PGN being pronounced "pee-gee-enn," antedating English language usage of the word to 1940. Linguist Ben Zimmer then mentioned this citation in his December 16, 2010 "On Language" column about acronyms in The New York Times Magazine. By 2011, the publication of the third edition of the Oxford English Dictionary added the expansive sense to its entry for acronym and included the 1940 citation. As the Oxford English Dictionary structures the senses in order of chronological development, it now gives the "initialism" sense first.

English language usage and style guides which have entries for acronym generally criticize the usage that refers to forms that are not pronounceable words. Fowler's Dictionary of Modern English Usage says that acronym "denotes abbreviations formed from initial letters of other words and pronounced as a single word, such as NATO (as distinct from B-B-C)" but adds later "In everyday use, acronym is often applied to abbreviations that are technically initialisms, since they are pronounced as separate letters." The Chicago Manual of Style acknowledges the complexity ("Furthermore, an acronym and initialism are occasionally combined (JPEG), and the line between initialism and acronym is not always clear") but still defines the terms as mutually exclusive. Other guides outright deny any legitimacy to the usage: Bryson's Dictionary of Troublesome Words says "Abbreviations that are not pronounced as words (IBM, ABC, NFL) are not acronyms; they are just abbreviations." Garner's Modern American Usage says "An acronym is made from the first letters or parts of a compound term. It's read or spoken as a single word, not letter by letter." The New York Times Manual of Style and Usage says "Unless pronounced as a word, an abbreviation is not an acronym."

In contrast, some style guides do support it, whether explicitly or implicitly. The 1994 edition of Merriam-Webster's Dictionary of English Usage defends the usage on the basis of a claim that dictionaries do not make a distinction. The BuzzFeed style guide describes CBS and PBS as "acronyms ending in S".

Comparing a few examples of each type

Pronounced as a word, containing only initial letters
NATO: "North Atlantic Treaty Organization"
Scuba: "self-contained underwater breathing apparatus"
Laser: "light amplification by stimulated emission of radiation"
GIF: "graphics interchange format"
Pronounced as a word, containing a mixture of initial and non-initial letters
Amphetamine: "alpha-methyl-phenethylamine"
Gestapo:  (secret state police)
Radar: "radio detection and ranging"
Lidar: "light detection and ranging"
Pronounced as a combination of spelling out and a word
CD-ROM: (cee-dee-) "compact disc read-only memory"
IUPAC: (i-u- or i-u-pee-a-cee) "International Union of Pure and Applied Chemistry"
JPEG: (jay- or jay-pee-e-gee) "Joint Photographic Experts Group"
SFMOMA: (ess-ef- or ess-ef-em-o-em-a) "San Francisco Museum of Modern Art"
Pronounced only as a string of letters
BBC: "British Broadcasting Corporation"
OEM: "original equipment manufacturer"
USA: "United States of America"
VHF: "very high frequency"
Pronounced as a string of letters, but with a shortcut
AAA:
(Triple-A) "American Automobile Association"; "abdominal aortic aneurysm"; "anti-aircraft artillery"; "Asistencia, Asesoría y Administración"
(Three-As) "Amateur Athletic Association"
IEEE: (I triple-E) "Institute of Electrical and Electronics Engineers"
NAACP: (N double-A C P or N A A C P) "National Association for the Advancement of Colored People"
NCAA: (N C double-A or N C two-A or N C A A) "National Collegiate Athletic Association"
Shortcut incorporated into name
3M: (three M) originally "Minnesota Mining and Manufacturing Company"
W3C: (W-three C) "World Wide Web Consortium"
A2DP: (A-two D P) "Advanced Audio Distribution Profile"
C4ISTAR: (C-four Istar) "Command, Control, Communications, Computers, Intelligence, Surveillance, Target Acquisition, and Reconnaissance"
Mnemonic acronyms, an abbreviation that is used to remember phrases or principles
KISS (Kiss) "Keep it simple, stupid", a design principle preferring simplicity 
SMART (Smart) "Specific, Measurable, Assignable, Realistic, Time-related", A principle of setting of goals and objectives
FAST (Fast) "Facial drooping, Arm weakness, Speech difficulties, Time", helps detect and enhance responsiveness to the needs of a person having a stroke
DRY (Dry) "Don't repeat yourself", A principle of software development aimed at reducing repetition of software patterns
Multi-layered acronyms
AIM: "AOL Instant Messenger," in which "AOL" originally stood for "America Online"
AFTA: "ASEAN Free Trade Area," where ASEAN stands for "Association of Southeast Asian Nations"
NAC Breda: (Dutch football club) "NOAD ADVENDO Combinatie" ("NOAD ADVENDO Combination"), formed by the 1912 merger of two clubs from Breda:
NOAD: ( "Never give up, always persevere")
ADVENDO: ( "Pleasant by entertainment and useful by relaxation")
GIMP: "GNU image manipulation program"
Recursive acronyms, in which the abbreviation refers to itself
GNU: "GNU's not Unix!"
Wine: "Wine is not an emulator" (originally, "Windows emulator")
TLA: Three Lettered Acronyms
These may go through multiple layers before the self-reference is found:
HURD: "HIRD of Unix-replacing daemons," where "HIRD" stands for "HURD of interfaces representing depth"
Pseudo-acronyms, which consist of a sequence of characters that, when pronounced as intended, invoke other, longer words with less typing This makes them gramograms.
CQ: cee-cue for "seek you", a code used by radio operators
IOU: i-o-u for "I owe you"
K9: kay-nine for "canine," used to designate police units using dogs
Abbreviations whose last abbreviated word is often redundantly included anyway
ATM machine: "automated teller machine" (machine)
HIV virus: "human immunodeficiency virus" (virus)
LCD display: "liquid-crystal display" (display)
PIN number: "personal identification number" (number)
Pronounced as a word, containing letters as a word in itself
PAYGO: "pay-as-you-go"

Historical and current use

Acronymy, like retronymy, is a linguistic process that has existed throughout history but for which there was little to no naming, conscious attention, or systematic analysis until relatively recent times. Like retronymy, it became much more common in the 20th century than it had formerly been.

Ancient examples of acronymy (before the term "acronym" was invented) include the following:
 Acronyms were used in Rome before the Christian era. For example, the official name for the Roman Empire, and the Republic before it, was abbreviated as SPQR. Inscriptions dating from antiquity, both on stone and on coins, use many abbreviations and acronyms to save space and work. For example, Roman first names, of which there was only a small set, were almost always abbreviated. Grammatical markers were abbreviated or left out entirely if they could be inferred from the rest of the text.
 So-called  (sacred names) were used in many Greek biblical manuscripts. The common words "God", "Jesus", "Christ", and some others, would be abbreviated by their first and last letters, marked with an overline. This was just one of many kinds of conventional scribal abbreviation, used to reduce the time-consuming workload of the scribe and save on valuable writing materials. The same convention is still commonly used in the inscriptions on religious icons and the stamps used to mark the eucharistic bread in Eastern Churches.
This interpretation dates from the 2nd and 3rd centuries and is preserved in the catacombs of Rome. Another ancient acronym for Jesus is the inscription INRI over the crucifix, for the Latin  ("Jesus the Nazarene, King of the Jews").
 The Hebrew language has a centuries-long history of acronyms pronounced as words. The Hebrew Bible ("Old Testament") is known as "Tanakh", an acronym composed from the Hebrew initial letters of its three major sections: "Torah" (five books of Moses), "Nevi'im" (prophets), and "K'tuvim" (writings). Many rabbinical figures from the Middle Ages onward are referred to in rabbinical literature by their pronounced acronyms, such as Rambam and Rashi from the initial letters of their full Hebrew names: "Rabbi Moshe ben Maimon" and "Rabbi Shlomo Yitzkhaki".

During the mid- to late 19th century, acronyms became a trend among American and European businessmen: abbreviating corporation names, such as on the sides of railroad cars (e.g., "Richmond, Fredericksburg and Potomac Railroad" → "RF&P"); on the sides of barrels and crates; and on ticker tape and newspaper stock listings (e.g. American Telephone and Telegraph Company → AT&T). Some well-known commercial examples dating from the 1890s through 1920s include "Nabisco" ("National Biscuit Company"), "Esso" (from "S.O.", from "Standard Oil"), and "Sunoco" ("Sun Oil Company").

Another field for the adoption of acronyms was modern warfare, with its many highly technical terms. While there is no recorded use of military acronyms dating from the American Civil War (acronyms such as "ANV" for "Army of Northern Virginia" postdate the war itself), they became somewhat common in World War I, and by World War II they were widespread even in the slang of soldiers, who referred to themselves as G.I.s.

The widespread, frequent use of acronyms across the whole range of linguistic registers is relatively new in most languages, becoming increasingly evident since the mid-20th century. As literacy spread and technology produced a constant stream of new and complex terms, abbreviations became increasingly convenient. The Oxford English Dictionary (OED) records the first printed use of the word initialism as occurring in 1899, but it did not come into general use until 1965, well after acronym had become common.

In English, acronyms  may be a 20th-century phenomenon. Linguist David Wilton in Word Myths: Debunking Linguistic Urban Legends claims that "forming words from acronyms is a distinctly twentieth- (and now twenty-first-) century phenomenon. There is only one known pre-twentieth-century [English] word with an acronymic origin and it was in vogue for only a short time in 1886. The word is colinderies or colinda, an acronym for the Colonial and Indian Exposition held in London in that year."

Early examples in English
The use of Latin and Neo-Latin terms in vernaculars has been pan-European and predates modern English. Some examples of acronyms in this class are:

A.M. (from Latin , "before noon") and P.M. (from Latin , "after noon")
A.D. (from Latin , "in the year of our Lord"), whose complement in English, B.C. [Before Christ], is English-sourced

The earliest example of a word derived from an acronym listed by the OED is "abjud" (now "abjad"), formed from the original first four letters of the Arabic alphabet in the late 18th century. Some acrostics predate this, however, such as the Restoration witticism arranging the names of some members of Charles II's Committee for Foreign Affairs to produce the "CABAL" ministry.

O.K., a term of disputed origin, dates back at least to the early 19th century and is now used around the world.

Current use
Acronyms are used most often to abbreviate names of organizations and long or frequently referenced terms. The armed forces and government agencies frequently employ acronyms; some well-known examples from the United States are among the "alphabet agencies" (jokingly referred to as "alphabet soup") created under the New Deal by Franklin D. Roosevelt (himself known as "FDR"). Business and industry also coin acronyms prolificly. The rapid advance of science and technology also drives the usage, as new inventions and concepts with multiword names create a demand for shorter, more pronounceable names. One representative example, from the U.S. Navy, is "COMCRUDESPAC", which stands for "commander, cruisers destroyers Pacific"; it is also seen as "ComCruDesPac". Inventors are encouraged to anticipate the formation of acronyms by making new terms "YABA-compatible" ("yet another bloody acronym"), meaning the term's acronym can be pronounced and is not an offensive word: "When choosing a new name, be sure it is 'YABA-compatible'."

Acronym use has been further popularized by text messaging on mobile phones with short message service (SMS), and instant messenger (IM). To fit messages into the 160-character SMS limit, and to save time, acronyms such as "GF" ("girlfriend"), "LOL" ("laughing out loud"), and "DL" ("download" or "down low") have become popular. Some prescriptivists disdain texting acronyms and abbreviations as decreasing clarity, or as failure to use "pure" or "proper" English. Others point out that languages have always continually changed, and argue that acronyms should be embraced as inevitable, or as innovation that adapts the language to changing circumstances. In this view, the modern practice is just the "proper" English of the current generation of speakers, much like the earlier abbreviation of corporation names on ticker tape or newspapers.

Exact pronunciation of "word acronyms" (those pronounced as words rather than sounded out as individual letters) often vary by speaker population. These may be regional, occupational, or generational differences, or simply personal preference. For instance, there have been decades of online debate about how to pronounce GIF ( or ) and BIOS (or ). Pronunciation may even vary within a single speaker's vocabulary, depending on narrow contexts. As an example, the database programming language SQL is usually said as three letters, but in reference to Microsoft's implementation is traditionally pronounced like the word sequel.

Expansion at first use

In writing for a broad audience, the words of an acronym are typically written out in full at its first occurrence within a given text. Expansion At First Use (EAFU) benefits readers unfamiliar with the acronym.

Another text aid is an abbreviation key which lists and expands all acronyms used, a reference for readers who skipped past the first use. (This is especially important for paper media, where no search utility is available to find the first use.) It also gives students a convenient review list to memorize the important acronyms introduced in a textbook chapter.

Expansion at first use and abbreviation keys originated in the print era, but they are equally useful for electronic text.

Jargon
While acronyms provide convenience and succinctness for specialists, they often degenerate into confusing jargon. This may be intentional, to exclude readers without domain-specific knowledge. New acronyms may also confuse when they coincide with an already existing acronym having a different meaning.

Medical literature has been struggling to control the proliferation of acronyms, including efforts by the American Academy of Dermatology.

As mnemonics
Acronyms are often taught as mnemonic devices: for example the colors of the rainbow are ROY G. BIV (red, orange, yellow, green, blue, indigo, violet). They are also used as mental checklists: in aviation GUMPS stands for gas-undercarriage-mixture-propeller-seatbelts. Other mnemonic acronyms include CAN SLIM in finance, PAVPANIC in English grammar, and PEMDAS in mathematics.

Acronyms as legendary etymology

It is not uncommon for acronyms to be cited in a kind of false etymology, called a folk etymology, for a word. Such etymologies persist in popular culture but have no factual basis in historical linguistics, and are examples of language-related urban legends. For example, "cop" is commonly cited as being derived, it is presumed, from "constable on patrol", and "posh" from "port outward, starboard home". With some of these specious expansions, the "belief" that the etymology is acronymic has clearly been tongue-in-cheek among many citers, as with "gentlemen only, ladies forbidden" for "golf", although many other (more credulous) people have uncritically taken it for fact. Taboo words in particular commonly have such false etymologies: "shit" from "ship/store high in transit" or "special high-intensity training" and "fuck" from "for unlawful carnal knowledge", or "fornication under consent/command of the king".

Orthographic styling

Punctuation

Showing the ellipsis of letters
In English, abbreviations have traditionally been written with a full stop/period/point in place of the deleted part to show the ellipsis of letters – although the colon and apostrophe have also had this role – and with a space after full stops (e.g. "A. D."). In the case of most acronyms, each letter is an abbreviation of a separate word and, in theory, should get its own termination mark. Such punctuation is diminishing with the belief that the presence of all-capital letters is sufficient to indicate that the word is an abbreviation.

Ellipsis-is-understood style
Some influential style guides, such as that of the BBC, no longer require punctuation to show ellipsis; some even proscribe it. Larry Trask, American author of The Penguin Guide to Punctuation, states categorically that, in British English, "this tiresome and unnecessary practice is now obsolete."

Pronunciation-dependent style and periods
Nevertheless, some influential style guides, many of them American, still require periods in certain instances. For example, The New York Times Manual of Style and Usage recommends following each segment with a period when the letters are pronounced individually, as in "K.G.B.", but not when pronounced as a word, as in "NATO". The logic of this style is that the pronunciation is reflected graphically by the punctuation scheme.

Other conventions
When a multiple-letter abbreviation is formed from a single word, periods are in general not used, although they may be common in informal usage. "TV", for example, may stand for a single word ("television" or "transvestite", for instance), and is in general spelled without punctuation (except in the plural). Although "PS" stands for the single word "postscript" (or the Latin postscriptum), it is often spelled with periods ("P.S.").

The slash ('/', or solidus) is sometimes used to separate the letters in an acronym, as in "N/A" ("not applicable, not available") and "c/o" ("care of").

Inconveniently long words used frequently in related contexts can be represented according to their letter count as a numeronym. For example, "i18n" abbreviates "internationalization", a computer-science term for adapting software for worldwide use. The "18" represents the 18 letters that come between the first and the last in "internationalization". "Localization" can be abbreviated "l10n", "multilingualization" "m17n", and "accessibility" "a11y". In addition to the use of a specific number replacing that many letters, the more general "x" can be used to replace an unspecified number of letters. Examples include "Crxn" for "crystallization" and the series familiar to physicians for history, diagnosis, and treatment ("hx", "dx", "tx").

Representing plurals and possessives
There is a question about how to pluralize acronyms. Often a writer will add an 's' following an apostrophe, as in "PC's". However, Kate Turabian, writing about style in academic writings, allows for an apostrophe to form plural acronyms "only when an abbreviation contains internal periods or both capital and lowercase letters". Turabian would therefore prefer "DVDs" and "URLs" and "Ph.D.'s". The Modern Language Association and American Psychological Association prohibit apostrophes from being used to pluralize acronyms regardless of periods (so "compact discs" would be "CDs" or "C.D.s"), whereas The New York Times Manual of Style and Usage requires an apostrophe when pluralizing all abbreviations regardless of periods (preferring "PC's, TV's and VCR's").

Possessive plurals that also include apostrophes for mere pluralization and periods appear especially complex: for example, "the C.D.'s' labels" (the labels of the compact discs). In some instances, however, an apostrophe may increase clarity: for example, if the final letter of an abbreviation is "S", as in "SOS's" (although abbreviations ending with S can also take "-es", e.g. "SOSes"), or when pluralizing an abbreviation that has periods.

A particularly rich source of options arises when the plural of an acronym would normally be indicated in a word other than the final word if spelled out in full. A classic example is "Member of Parliament", which in plural is "Members of Parliament". It is possible then to abbreviate this as "M's P". (or similar), as used by former Australian Prime Minister Ben Chifley. This usage is less common than forms with "s" at the end, such as "MPs", and may appear dated or pedantic. In common usage, therefore, "weapons of mass destruction" becomes "WMDs", "prisoners of war" becomes "POWs", and "runs batted in" becomes "RBIs".

The argument that acronyms should have no different plural form (for example, "If D can stand for disc, it can also stand for discs") is in general disregarded because of the practicality in distinguishing singulars and plurals. This is not the case, however, when the abbreviation is understood to describe a plural noun already: For example, "U.S." is short for "United States", but not "United State". In this case, the options for making a possessive form of an abbreviation that is already in its plural form without a final "s" may seem awkward: for example, "U.S.", "U.S.'s", etc. In such instances, possessive abbreviations are often forgone in favor of simple attributive usage (for example, "the U.S. economy") or expanding the abbreviation to its full form and then making the possessive (for example, "the United States' economy"). On the other hand, in speech, the pronunciation "United States's" is sometimes used.

Abbreviations that come from single, rather than multiple, words – such as "TV" ("television") – are usually pluralized without apostrophes ("two TVs"); most writers feel that the apostrophe should be reserved for the possessive ("the TV's antenna").

This old convention is still followed for a limited number of English abbreviations, such as SS. for "Saints", pp. for the Latin plural of "pages", or MSS for "manuscripts". In the case of pp. it derives from the original Latin phrase "per procurationem" meaning 'through the agency of'; an English translation alternative is particular pages in a book or document: see pp. 8–88.

Case

All-caps style

The most common capitalization scheme seen with acronyms is all-uppercase (all caps), except for those few that have linguistically taken on an identity as regular words, with the acronymous etymology of the words fading into the background of common knowledge, such as has occurred with the words "scuba", "laser", and "radar": these are known as anacronyms. Anacronyms (note well -acro-) should not be homophonously confused with anachronyms (note well -chron-), which are a type of misnomer.

Small-caps variant
Small caps are sometimes used to make the run of capital letters seem less jarring to the reader. For example, the style of some American publications, including the Atlantic Monthly and USA Today, is to use small caps for acronyms longer than three letters; thus "U.S." and "FDR" in normal caps, but "" in small caps. The acronyms "AD" and "BC" are often smallcapped as well, as in: "From ".

Mixed-case variant
Words derived from an acronym by affixing are typically expressed in mixed case, so the root acronym is clear. For example, "pre-WWII politics", "post-NATO world", "DNase". In some cases a derived acronym may also be expressed in mixed case. For example, "messenger RNA" and "transfer RNA" become "mRNA" and "tRNA".

Pronunciation-dependent style and case
Some publications choose to capitalize only the first letter of acronyms, reserving all-caps styling for initialisms, writing the pronounced acronyms "Nato" and "Aids" in mixed case, but the initialisms "USA" and "FBI" in all caps. For example, this is the style used in The Guardian, and BBC News typically edits to this style (though its official style guide, dating from 2003, still recommends all-caps). The logic of this style is that the pronunciation is reflected graphically by the capitalization scheme. However, it conflicts with conventional English usage of first-letter upper-casing as a marker of proper names in many cases; e.g. AIDS stands for acquired immuno-deficiency syndrome which is not a proper name, while Aids is in the style of one.

Some style manuals also base the letters' case on their number. The New York Times, for example, keeps "NATO" in all capitals (while several guides in the British press may render it "Nato"), but uses lower case in "Unicef" (from "United Nations International Children's Emergency Fund") because it is more than four letters, and to style it in caps might look ungainly (flirting with the appearance of "shouting capitals").

Numerals and constituent words
While abbreviations typically exclude the initials of short function words (such as "and", "or", "of", or "to"), this is not always the case. Sometimes function words are included to make a pronounceable acronym, such as CORE (Congress of Racial Equality). Sometimes the letters representing these words are written in lower case, such as in the cases of "TfL" ("Transport for London") and LotR (The Lord of the Rings); this usually occurs when the acronym represents a multi-word proper noun.

Numbers (both cardinal and ordinal) in names are often represented by digits rather than initial letters, as in "4GL" ("fourth generation language") or "G77" ("Group of 77"). Large numbers may use metric prefixes, as with "Y2K" for "Year 2000" (sometimes written "Y2k", because the SI symbol for 1000 is "k", not "K", which stands for "kelvin", the SI unit for temperature). Exceptions using initials for numbers include "TLA" ("three-letter acronym/abbreviation") and "GoF" ("Gang of Four"). Abbreviations using numbers for other purposes include repetitions, such as "A2DP" ("Advanced Audio Distribution Profile"), "W3C" ("World Wide Web Consortium"), and T3 (Trends, Tips & Tools for Everyday Living); pronunciation, such as "B2B" ("business to business"); and numeronyms, such as "i18n" ("internationalization"; "18" represents the 18 letters between the initial "i" and the final "n").

Casing of expansions
Authors of expository writing will sometimes capitalize or otherwise distinctively format the initials of the expansion for pedagogical emphasis (for example, writing: "the onset of Congestive Heart Failure (CHF)" or "the onset of congestive heart failure (CHF)"), but this conflicts with the convention of English orthography, which reserves capitals in the middle of sentences for proper nouns; and would be rendered as "the onset of congestive heart failure (CHF)" when following the AMA Manual of Style.

Changes to (or wordplay on) the expanded meaning

Pseudo-acronyms
Some apparent acronyms or other abbreviations do not stand for anything and cannot be expanded to some meaning. Such pseudo-acronyms may be pronunciation-based, such as "BBQ" (bee-bee-cue), for "barbecue", or "K9" (kay-nine) for "canine". Pseudo-acronyms also frequently develop as "orphan initialisms"; an existing acronym is redefined as a non-acronymous name, severing its link to its previous meaning. For example, the letters of the "SAT", a US college entrance test originally dubbed "Scholastic Aptitude Test", no longer officially stand for anything. The US-based abortion-rights organization "NARAL" is another example of this; in that case, the organization changed their name three times, with the long-form of the name always corresponding to the letters "NARAL", before eventually opting to simply be known by the short-form, without being connected to a long-form.

This is common with companies that want to retain brand recognition while moving away from an outdated image: American Telephone and Telegraph became AT&T, "Kentucky Fried Chicken" became "KFC" to de-emphasize the role of frying in the preparation of its signature dishes, and British Petroleum became BP. Russia Today has rebranded itself as RT. American Movie Classics has simply rebranded itself as AMC. Genzyme Transgenics Corporation became GTC Biotherapeutics, Inc.; The Learning Channel became TLC; and American District Telegraph became simply known as ADT.

Pseudo-acronyms may have advantages in international markets: for example, some national affiliates of International Business Machines are legally incorporated with "IBM" in their names (for example, IBM Canada) to avoid translating the full name into local languages. Likewise, UBS is the name of the merged Union Bank of Switzerland and Swiss Bank Corporation, and HSBC has replaced the long name Hongkong and Shanghai Banking Corporation. Some companies which have a name giving a clear indication of their place of origin will choose to use acronyms when expanding to foreign markets: for example, Toronto-Dominion Bank continues to operate under the full name in Canada, but its U.S. subsidiary is known as TD Bank, just as Royal Bank of Canada used its full name in Canada (a constitutional monarchy), but its U.S. subsidiary is called RBC Bank. The India-based JSW Group of companies is another example of the original name (Jindal South West Group) being re-branded into a pseudo-acronym while expanding into other geographical areas in and outside of India.

Redundant acronyms and RAS syndrome

Rebranding can lead to redundant acronym syndrome, as when Trustee Savings Bank became TSB Bank, or when Railway Express Agency became REA Express. A few high-tech companies have taken the redundant acronym to the extreme: for example, ISM Information Systems Management Corp. and SHL Systemhouse Ltd. Examples in entertainment include the television shows CSI: Crime Scene Investigation and Navy: NCIS ("Navy" was dropped in the second season), where the redundancy was likely designed to educate new viewers as to what the initials stood for. The same reasoning was in evidence when the Royal Bank of Canada's Canadian operations rebranded to RBC Royal Bank, or when Bank of Montreal rebranded their retail banking subsidiary BMO Bank of Montreal.

Another common example is "RAM memory", which is redundant because "RAM" ("random-access memory") includes the initial of the word "memory". "PIN" stands for "personal identification number", obviating the second word in "PIN number"; in this case its retention may be motivated to avoid ambiguity with the homophonous word "pin". Other examples include "ATM machine", "EAB bank", "HIV virus", Microsoft's NT Technology, and the formerly redundant "SAT test", now simply "SAT Reasoning Test"). TNN (The Nashville/National Network) also renamed itself "The New TNN" for a brief interlude.

Redefined acronyms
In some cases, while the initials in an acronym may stay the same, for what those letters stand may change. Examples include the following:

DVD was originally an acronym for the unofficial term "digital video disc", but is now stated by the DVD Forum as standing for "Digital Versatile Disc"
GAO changed the full form of its name from "General Accounting Office" to "Government Accountability Office"
GPO changed the full form of its name from "Government Printing Office" to "Government Publishing Office"
RAID was originally an acronym for "Redundant Array of Inexpensive Disks" but has since been redefined as "Redundant Array of Independent Disks"
The UICC was founded as the "International Union Against Cancer", and its initials originally came from the Romance-language versions of that name (such as French ). The English expansion of its name has since been changed to "Union for International Cancer Control" so that it would also correspond to the UICC acronym.
WWF was originally an acronym for "World Wildlife Fund", but now stands for "World Wide Fund for Nature" (although the organization's branches in the U.S. and Canada still use the original name)

Backronyms

A backronym (or bacronym) is a phrase that is constructed "after the fact" from a previously existing word. For example, the novelist and critic Anthony Burgess once proposed that the word "book" ought to stand for "box of organized knowledge". A classic real-world example of this is the name of the predecessor to the Apple Macintosh, the Apple Lisa, which was said to refer to "Local Integrated Software Architecture", but was actually named after Steve Jobs's daughter, born in 1978.

Backronyms are oftentimes used for comedic effect. An example of creating a backronym for comedic effect would be in naming a group or organization, the name "A.C.R.O.N.Y.M." stands for (among other things) "a clever regiment of nerdy young men".

Contrived acronyms
Acronyms are sometimes contrived, that is, deliberately designed to be especially apt for the thing being named (by having a dual meaning or by borrowing the positive connotations of an existing word). Some examples of contrived acronyms are USA PATRIOT, CAN SPAM, CAPTCHA and ACT UP. The clothing company French Connection began referring to itself as fcuk, standing for "French Connection United Kingdom". The company then created T-shirts and several advertising campaigns that exploit the acronym's similarity to the taboo word "fuck".

The U.S. Department of Defense's Defense Advanced Research Projects Agency (DARPA) is known for developing contrived acronyms to name projects, including RESURRECT, NIRVANA, and DUDE. In July 2010, Wired magazine reported that DARPA announced programs to "... transform biology from a descriptive to a predictive field of science" named BATMAN and ROBIN for "Biochronicity and Temporal Mechanisms Arising in Nature" and "Robustness of Biologically-Inspired Networks", a reference to the Batman and Robin comic-book superheroes.

The short-form names of clinical trials and other scientific studies constitute a large class of acronyms that includes many contrived examples, as well as many with a partial rather than complete correspondence of letters to expansion components. These trials tend to have full names that are accurately descriptive of what the trial is about but are thus also too long to serve practically as names within the syntax of a sentence, so a short name is also developed, which can serve as a syntactically useful handle and also provide at least a degree of mnemonic reminder as to the full name. Examples widely known in medicine include the ALLHAT trial (Antihypertensive and Lipid-Lowering Treatment to Prevent Heart Attack Trial) and the CHARM trial (Candesartan in Heart Failure: Assessment of Reduction in Mortality and Morbidity). The fact that RAS syndrome is often involved, as well as that the letters often don't entirely match, have sometimes been pointed out by annoyed researchers preoccupied by the idea that because the archetypal form of acronyms originated with one-to-one letter matching, there must be some impropriety in their ever deviating from that form. However, the raison d'être of clinical trial acronyms, as with gene and protein symbols, is simply to have a syntactically usable and easily recalled short name to complement the long name that is often syntactically unusable and not memorized. It is useful for the short name to give a reminder of the long name, which supports the reasonable censure of "cutesy" examples that provide little to no hint of it. But beyond that reasonably close correspondence, the short name's chief utility is in functioning cognitively as a name, rather than being a cryptic and forgettable string, albeit faithful to the matching of letters. However, other reasonable critiques have been (1) that it is irresponsible to mention trial acronyms without explaining them at least once by providing the long names somewhere in the document, and (2) that the proliferation of trial acronyms has resulted in ambiguity, such as 3 different trials all called ASPECT, which is another reason why failing to explain them somewhere in the document is irresponsible in scientific communication. At least one study has evaluated the citation impact and other traits of acronym-named trials compared with others, finding both good aspects (mnemonic help, name recall) and potential flaws (connotatively driven bias).

Some acronyms are chosen deliberately to avoid a name considered undesirable: For example, Verliebt in Berlin (ViB), a German telenovela, was first intended to be  (All for Love), but was changed to avoid the resultant acronym ANAL. Likewise, the Computer Literacy and Internet Technology qualification is known as CLaIT, rather than CLIT. In Canada, the Canadian Conservative Reform Alliance (Party) was quickly renamed to the "Canadian Reform Conservative Alliance" when its opponents pointed out that its initials spelled CCRAP (pronounced "see crap"). Two Irish Institutes of Technology (Galway and Tralee) chose different acronyms from other institutes when they were upgraded from Regional Technical colleges. Tralee RTC became the Institute of Technology Tralee (ITT), as opposed to Tralee Institute of Technology (TIT). Galway RTC became Galway-Mayo Institute of Technology (GMIT), as opposed to Galway Institute of Technology (GIT). The charity sports organization Team in Training is known as "TNT" and not "TIT". Technological Institute of Textile & Sciences, however, is still known as "TITS". George Mason University was planning to name their law school the "Antonin Scalia School of Law" (ASSOL) in honor of the late Antonin Scalia, only to change it to the "Antonin Scalia Law School" later.

Macronyms/nested acronyms

A macronym, or nested acronym, is an acronym in which one or more letters stand for acronyms (or abbreviations) themselves. The word "macronym" is a portmanteau of "macro-" and "acronym".

Some examples of macronyms are:
 XHR stands for "XML HTTP Request", in which "XML" is "Extensible Markup Language", and HTTP stands for "HyperText Transfer Protocol"
 POWER stands for "Performance Optimization With Enhanced RISC", in which "RISC" stands for "Reduced Instruction Set Computing"
 VHDL stands for "VHSIC Hardware Description Language", in which "VHSIC" stands for "Very High Speed Integrated Circuit"
 XSD stands for "XML Schema Definition", in which "XML" stands for "Extensible Markup Language"
 AIM stands for "AOL Instant Messenger", in which "AOL" originally stood for "America Online"
 HASP stood for "Houston Automatic Spooling Priority", but "spooling" itself was an acronym: "simultaneous peripheral operations on-line"
 VORTAC stands for "VOR+TACAN", in which "VOR" is "VHF omnidirectional range" (where VHF = Very High Frequency radio) and "TAC" is short for TACAN, which stands for "Tactical Air Navigation"
 Global Information Assurance Certification has a number of nested acronyms for its certifications, e.g. "GSEC" is an acronym for "GIAC Security Essentials"
 RBD stands for "REM Behavior Disorder", in which "REM" stands for "Rapid Eye Movement"

Some macronyms can be multiply nested: the second-order acronym points to another one further down a hierarchy. In an informal competition run by the magazine New Scientist, a fully documented specimen was discovered that may be the most deeply nested of all: RARS is the "Regional ATOVS Retransmission Service"; ATOVS is "Advanced TOVS"; TOVS is "TIROS operational vertical sounder"; and TIROS is "Television infrared observational satellite". Fully expanded, "RARS" might thus become "Regional Advanced Television Infrared Observational Satellite Operational Vertical Sounder Retransmission Service", which would produce the much more unwieldy acronym "RATIOSOVSRS".

Another example is VITAL, which expands to "VHDL Initiative Towards ASIC Libraries" (a total of 15 words when fully expanded).

However, to say that "RARS" stands directly for that string of words, or can be interchanged with it in syntax (in the same way that "CHF" can be usefully interchanged with "congestive heart failure"), is a prescriptive misapprehension rather than a linguistically accurate description; the true nature of such a term is closer to anacronymic than to being interchangeable like simpler acronyms are. The latter are fully reducible in an attempt to "spell everything out and avoid all abbreviations", but the former are irreducible in that respect; they can be annotated with parenthetical explanations, but they cannot be eliminated from speech or writing in any useful or practical way. Just as the words laser and radar function as words in syntax and cognition without a need to focus on their acronymic origins, terms such as "RARS" and "CHA2DS2–VASc score" are irreducible in natural language; if they are purged, the form of language that is left may conform to some imposed rule, but it cannot be described as remaining natural. Similarly, protein and gene nomenclature, which uses symbols extensively, includes such terms as the name of the NACHT protein domain, which reflects the symbols of some proteins that contain the domain – NAIP (NLR family apoptosis inhibitor protein), C2TA (major histocompatibility complex class II transcription activator), HET-E (incompatibility locus protein from Podospora anserine), and TP1 (telomerase-associated protein) – but is not syntactically reducible to them. The name is thus itself more symbol than acronym, and its expansion cannot replace it while preserving its function in natural syntax as a name within a clause clearly parsable by human readers or listeners.

Recursive acronyms

A special type of macronym, the recursive acronym, has letters whose expansion refers back to the macronym itself. One of the earliest examples appears in The Hacker's Dictionary as MUNG, which stands for "MUNG Until No Good".

Some examples of recursive acronyms are:
 GNU stands for "GNU's Not Unix!"
 LAME stands for "LAME Ain't an MP3 Encoder"
 PHP stands for "PHP: Hypertext Preprocessor"
 WINE stands for "WINE Is Not an Emulator"
 HURD stands for "HIRD of Unix-replacing daemons", where HIRD itself stands for "HURD of interfaces representing depth" (a "mutually recursive" acronym)

Non-English languages

Specific languages

Chinese
In English language discussions of languages with syllabic or logographic writing systems (such as Chinese, Japanese, and Korean), "acronyms" describe the short forms that take selected characters from a multi-character word.

In some cases, however, other characters than the first can be selected. For example, the local short form of "Hong Kong University" uses "Kong" rather than "Hong".

There are also cases where some longer phrases are abbreviated drastically, especially in Chinese politics, where proper nouns were initially translated from Soviet Leninist terms. For instance, the full name of China's highest ruling council, the Politburo Standing Committee (PSC), is "Standing Committee of the Central Political Bureau of the Communist Party of China". The term then reduced the "Communist Party of China" part of its name through acronyms, then the "Standing Committee" part, again through acronyms, to create "". Alternatively, it omitted the "Communist Party" part altogether, creating "Politburo Standing Committee", and eventually just "Standing Committee". The PSC's members full designations are "Member of the Standing Committee of the Central Political Bureau of the Communist Party of China"; this was eventually drastically reduced to simply Changwei, with the term Ruchang used increasingly for officials destined for a future seat on the PSC. In another example, the word "" (National People's Congress) can be broken into four parts: "" = "the whole nation", "" = "people", "" = "representatives", "" = "conference". Yet, in its short form "" (literally "man/people big"), only the first characters from the second and the fourth parts are selected; the first part ("") and the third part ("") are simply ignored. In describing such abbreviations, the term initialism is inapplicable.

Many proper nouns become shorter and shorter over time. For example, the CCTV New Year's Gala, whose full name is literally read as "China Central Television Spring Festival Joint Celebration Evening Gala" was first shortened to "Spring Festival Joint Celebration Evening Gala", but eventually referred to as simply Chunwan. Along the same vein, CCTV or Zhongguo Zhongyang Dianshi Tai was reduced to Yangshi in the mid-2000s.

Korean
Many aspects of academics in Korea follow similar acronym patterns as Chinese, owing to the two languages' commonalities, like using the word for "big" or "great" i.e. dae, to refer to universities (daehak, literally "great learning" although "big school" is an acceptable alternate). They can be interpreted similarly to American university appellations such as, "UPenn" or "Texas Tech."

Some acronyms are shortened forms of the school's name, like how Hongik University (Hongik Daehakgyo) is shortened to Hongdae ("Hong, the big [school]" or "Hong-U") Other acronyms can refer to the university's main subject, e.g. Korea National University of Education (Hanguk Gyowon Daehakgyo) is shortened to Gyowondae (교원대, "Big Ed." or "Ed.-U"). Other schools use a Koreanized version of their English acronym. The Korea Advanced Institute of Science and Technology (Hanguk Gwahak Gisulwon) is referred to as KAIST (Kaiseuteu) in both English and Korean. The 3 most prestigious schools in Korea are known as SKY (스카이, seukai), combining the first letter of their English names (Seoul National, Korea, and Yonsei Universities). In addition, the College Scholastic Ability Test (Daehak Suhang Neungryeok Siheom) is shortened to Suneung ("S.A.").

Japanese

The Japanese language makes extensive use of abbreviations, but only some of these are acronyms.

Non-Chinese foreign borrowings (gairaigo) are instead frequently abbreviated as clipped compounds, rather than acronyms, using several initial sounds. This is visible in katakana transcriptions of foreign words, but is also found with native words (written in hiragana). For example, the Pokémon media franchise's name originally stood for "pocket monsters" ( [po-ke-tto-mon-su-tā] → ), which is still the long-form of the name in Japanese, and "wāpuro" stands for "word processor" ( [wā-do-pu-ro-se-ssā]→ ).

German
To a greater degree than English does, German tends toward acronyms that use initial syllables rather than initial single letters, although it uses many of the latter type as well.

Hebrew

It is common to take more than just one initial letter from each of the words composing the acronym; regardless of this, the abbreviation sign gershayim  is always written between the second-last and last letters of the non-inflected form of the acronym, even if by this it separates letters of the same original word. In inflected forms the abbreviation sign gershayim remains between the second-last and last letters of the non-inflected form of the acronym (e.g. "report", singular: ,; "squad commander", masculine: ,).

Indonesian

There is also a widespread use of acronyms in Indonesia in every aspect of social life. For example, the Golkar political party stands for "Partai Golongan Karya", Monas stands for "Monumen Nasional" (National Monument), the Angkot public transport stands for "Angkutan Kota" (city public transportation), warnet stands for "warung internet" (internet cafe), and many others. Some acronyms are considered formal (or officially adopted), while many more are considered informal, slang or colloquial.

The capital's metropolitan area (Jakarta and its surrounding satellite regions), Jabodetabek, is another infamous acronym. This stands for "Jakarta-Bogor-Depok-Tangerang-Bekasi". Many highways are also named by the acronym method; e.g. Jalan Tol (Toll Road) Jagorawi (Jakarta-Bogor-Ciawi) and Purbaleunyi (Purwakarta-Bandung-Cileunyi), Joglo Semar (Jogja-Solo-Semarang).

In some languages, especially those that use certain alphabets, many acronyms come from the governmental use, particularly in the military and law enforcement services. The Indonesian military (TNI – Tentara Nasional Indonesia) and Indonesian police (POLRI – Kepolisian Republik Indonesia) are infamous for heavy acronyms use. Examples include the Kopassus (Komando Pasukan Khusus; Special Forces Command), Kopaska (Komando Pasukan Katak; Frogmen Command), Kodim (Komando Distrik Militer; Military District Command – one of the Indonesian army's administrative divisions), Serka (Sersan Kepala; Head Sergeant), Akmil (Akademi Militer; Military Academy – in Magelang) and many other terms regarding ranks, units, divisions, procedures, etc.

Malay 
Although not as common as in Indonesian, a number of Malay words are formed by merging two words, such as tadika from "taman didikan kanak-kanak" (kindergarten) and pawagam from "panggung wayang gambar." This, however, has been less prevalent in the modern era, in contrary to Indonesian. It is still often for names such as organisation names, among the most famous being MARA from Majlis Amanah Rakyat (People's Trust Council,) a government agency in Malaysia.

Some acronyms are developed from the Jawi (Malay in Arabic script) spelling of the name and may not reflect its Latin counterpart such as PAS from Parti Islam Se-Malaysia (Malaysian Islamic Party) which originated from the Jawi acronym ڤاس from ڤرتي إسلام سمليسيا, with the same pronunciation, since the first letter of the word "Islam" in Jawi uses the letter Aleph, which is pronounced like the letter A when in such position as in the acronym.

Rules in writing initialisms in Malay differ based on its script. In its Latin form, the initialism would be spelt much like in English, using capitals written without any spacing, such as TNB for Tenaga Nasional Berhad.

In Jawi, however, the way initialisms are different depending on the source language. For Malay initialisms, the initial Jawi letters would be written separated by a period such as د.ب.ڤ for ديوان بهاس دان ڤوستاک. If the initialism is from a different language, however, it would be written by transliterating each letter from the original language, such as عيم.سي.عيم.سي. for MCMC, or الفا.ڤي.ثيتا for Α.Π.Θ.

Russian
Acronyms that use parts of words (not necessarily syllables) are commonplace in Russian as well, e.g.

Historically, "OTMA" was an acronym sometimes used by the daughters of Emperor Nicholas II of Russia and his consort, Alexandra Feodorovna, as a group nickname for themselves, built from the first letter of each girl's name in the order of their births: "Olga, Tatiana, Maria and Anastasia".

Swahili
Multiple initial letters (often the initial syllable of words) are often drawn together, as seen more in some languages than others.

Vietnamese
In Vietnamese, which has an abundance of compound words, initialisms are very commonly used for both proper and common nouns. Examples include TP.HCM (Ho Chi Minh City), THPT (high school), CLB (club), CSDL (database), NXB (publisher), ÔBACE (a general form of address), and CTTĐVN (Vietnamese Martyrs). Longer examples include CHXHCNVN (Socialist Republic of Vietnam) and MTDTGPMNVN (Viet Cong). Long initialisms have become widespread in legal contexts in Vietnam, for example . It is also common for a writer to coin an ad hoc initialism for repeated use in an article.

Each letter in an initialism corresponds to one morpheme, that is, one syllable. The letter "Ư" is often replaced by "W" in initialisms to avoid confusion with "U", for example UBTWMTTQVN or UBTƯMTTQVN for Ủy ban Trung ương Mặt trận Tổ quốc Việt Nam (Central Committee of the Vietnamese Fatherland Front).

Initialisms are purely a written convenience, being pronounced the same way as their expansions. As the names of many Vietnamese letters are disyllabic, it would be less convenient to pronounce an initialism by its individual letters. Acronyms pronounced as words are rare in Vietnamese, occurring when an acronym itself is borrowed from another language.

As in Chinese, many compound words can be shortened to the first syllable when forming a longer word. For example, the term Việt Cộng is derived from the first syllables of "Việt Nam" (Vietnam) and "Cộng sản" (communist). This mechanism is limited to Sino-Vietnamese vocabulary. Unlike with Chinese, such clipped compounds are considered to be portmanteau words or blend words rather than acronyms or initialisms, because the Vietnamese alphabet still requires each component word to be written as more than one character.

General grammatical considerations

Declension
In languages where nouns are declined, various methods are used. An example is Finnish, where a colon is used to separate inflection from the letters:
An acronym is pronounced as a word: Nato  –   "into Nato", Nasalta "from NASA"
An acronym is pronounced as letters: EU  –   "into EU"
An acronym is interpreted as words: EU  –   "into EU"
The process above is similar to the way that hyphens are used for clarity in English when prefixes are added to acronyms: thus pre-NATO policy (rather than preNATO).

Lenition
In languages such as Scottish Gaelic and Irish, where lenition (initial consonant mutation) is commonplace, acronyms must also be modified in situations where case and context dictate it.

See also
 
 Acronyms in the Philippines
 Acrostic
 
 List of astronomy acronyms
 
 
 Lists of abbreviations
 List of abbreviations in photography
 Lists of acronyms
 List of fictional espionage organizations
 List of Japanese Latin alphabetic abbreviations

Explanatory notes

References

External links

 

 
Types of words